Mayen is a  boma in  Baidit payam, Bor West County, Jonglei State, South Sudan, about 30 kilometers north of Bor.  The village is located at the southern extent of the sudd, South Sudan's central wetlands, near to the east bank of the  Bahr al Jabal River.

Demographics
According to the Fifth Population and Housing Census of Sudan, conducted in April 2008, Mayen  boma had a population of 3,810 people, composed of 1,951 male and 1859 female residents, who support themselves largely through farming and fishing.

Notes

References 

Populated places in Jonglei State